Jorge Luis Morán Rodas (born October 4, 1989 in Coatepeque, El Salvador) is a Salvadoran professional footballer, who plays as a midfielder.

Club career

Once Municipal
Morán's professional career began in June 2007 when he signed a contract with Salvadoran national league club, Once Municipal after coming through several youth systems. He made his professional debut on August 11, 2008, in a league match against Isidro Metapán.

Isidro Metapán
Morán signed with Isidro Metapán in 2008. With Isidro Metapán, he played at the 2009–10 CONCACAF Champions League Group Stage.

FAS
In 2012, Morán signed with FAS.

International career
In July 2011, Morán was selected for the El Salvador national under-23 football team for the UNCAF U-23 tournament.

Career statistics

Club
As 2018.

International goals
Scores and results list El Salvador's goal tally first.

Honours

Club 
Isidro Metapán
 Primera División
 Champion: Apertura 2008, Clausura 2009, Clausura 2010, Apertura 2010, Apertura 2011

FAS
 Primera División
 Runners-up: Clausura 2013, Apertura 2013, Apertura 2015

References

External links
 Jorge Morán at Soccerway 

1989 births
Living people
People from Santa Ana Department
Association football midfielders
Salvadoran footballers
Once Municipal footballers
A.D. Isidro Metapán footballers
2009 CONCACAF U-20 Championship players